The Scout Rangers, known officially as the First Scout Ranger Regiment, is a Philippine Army unit specializing in anti-guerrilla jungle warfare, raids, ambushes, close quarters combat, urban warfare and sabotage.

Their headquarters is based at Camp Pablo Tecson in San Miguel, Bulacan.

The regiment is also known as Musangs (in English, Scout Rangers)

History
The First Scout Ranger Regiment was formed on November 25, 1950, under the command of former AFP Vice Chief of Staff and Defense Secretary Rafael M. Ileto The unit was modelled after the Alamo Scouts and the US Army Rangers. The FSSR was created due to a growing need to counter the Hukbalahap guerrillas with a force trained in small unit actions. Initially known as the Scout Ranger Training Unit (SRTU), they were made up of 5 man teams, made up of one officer and 4 enlisted men. SRTU teams used deep penetration tactics to infiltrate Huk-held territory and take out their units. In 1954, the Army decided to combine all active SRTU units into the 1st Scout Ranger Regiment.

The Scout Rangers participated in the December 1989 coup attempt against the administration of Corazon Aquino. Led by then  Captain Danilo Lim, Major Abraham Purugganan and Lieutenant Colonel Rafael Galvez, some 2500 Rangers took over Makati in the most destructive coup attempt against the Aquino administration, which left hundreds of civilians and soldiers dead, and hundreds more injured.

The Scout Rangers played a major role in capturing the Moro Islamic Liberation Front (MILF) rebel camp during the 2000 all-out war against the MILF.

During the Battle of Marawi of 2017, Scout Rangers were the first elite units deployed with the 1st Infantry Division to neutralize the Islamic State-inspired groups the Maute and Abu Sayyaf and their leaders Isnilon Hapilon and the Maute brothers. During the battle, the Rangers incurred many casualties including a veteran Captain of the battle of Zamboanga city. A Scout Ranger is credited with killing Hapilon during the final stages of battle.

President Duterte was awarded the SR badge in 2017.

Organization

Units
The following are subordinate battalions and companies of the First Scout Rangers.

Battalions
 1st Scout Ranger Battalion 
 2nd Scout Ranger Battalion
 3rd Scout Ranger Battalion
 4th Scout Ranger Battalion
 5th Scout Ranger Battalion

Companies

 1st Scout Ranger Company "Reconnaissance"
 2nd Scout Ranger Company "Venceremos" (Sp., "We will win")
 3rd Scout Ranger Company "Terminator"
 4th Scout Ranger Company "Final Option"
 5th Scout Ranger Company "Salaknib" (Iloko, "Shield")
 6th Scout Ranger Company "The Cutting Edge"
 7th Scout Ranger Company "In Hoc Signo Vinces" (L., "Under this sign thou shalt conquer")
 8th Scout Ranger Company "Destruere Hostis Deus" (L., "Destroy the enemy of God")
 9th Scout Ranger Company "Angát sa Ibá!" (Tag., "Above all others!")
 10th Scout Ranger Company "We Lead" (Ultimus Fortis)
 11th Scout Ranger Company "Pericoloso" (It., "Dangerous")
 12th Scout Ranger Company "Always Ready"
 13th Scout Ranger Company "Warrior"
 14th Scout Ranger Company "Mabalasik" (Tag., "Fierce")
 15th Scout Ranger Company "Mandirigmâ" (Tag., "Fighters" or "Warriors")
 16th Scout Ranger Company "Mabangís" (Tag., "Vicious")
 17th Scout Ranger Company "Mapanganib" (Tag., "Dangerous")
 18th Scout Ranger Company "Makamandág" (Tag., "Venomous")
 19th Scout Ranger Company "Dimalupig" (Tag., "Unbeatable")
 20th Scout Ranger Company "Hellcat"
 21st Scout Ranger Company "Mapangahas" (Tag., "Fearless")
 22nd Scout Ranger Company "Cul Peri Duro" (Tag., "Strike Hard")

Training
In November 2021, the Scout Rangers have conducted joint training with Kopassus operators.

References

Bibliography
 Dennis V. Eclarin, Scout Ranger Combat Guide (Third Edition), 2003, The Philippine Star.
 

Special forces of the Philippines
Regiments of the Philippines
Military special forces regiments
Military units and formations established in 1950